Scatter My Ashes at Bergdorf's is a US 2013 documentary feature directed by Matthew Miele about the New York City luxury goods department store Bergdorf Goodman, situated on Fifth Avenue where it meets Grand Army Plaza. The film's title is lifted from the caption of a 1990 Victoria Roberts cartoon that appeared in pages of The New Yorker. The film features celebrities, store executives and employees, designers and customers testifying to their love of the place.

The film opened at theatres on May 3, 2013.

See also
Dita and the Family Business, a 2001 documentary film about the store

References

External links
 
 
 
 Celebrating Conspicuous Consumption
 Review: Scatter My Ashes at Bergdorf’s
 Scatter My Ashes at Bergdorf's | Film Review | Slant Magazine
 Scatter My Ashes at Bergdorf's – review, The Gardian
 Hollywood Reporter

2013 films
2013 documentary films
American documentary films
Documentary films about business
Documentary films about New York City
Films about fashion
Films set in Manhattan
2010s English-language films
2010s American films
Films about companies